The third season of the German singing competition The Masked Singer premiered on 20 October 2020 on ProSieben. This season in the panel were Bülent Ceylan and Sonja Zietlow, replacing Ruth Moschner and Rea Garvey. Matthias Opdenhövel also returned as host.

On 24 November 2020, the Skelett (singer Sarah Lombardi) was declared the winner and the Alien (musician Alec Völkel) was the runner-up.

Panelists and host

On 24 April 2020, ProSieben announced the third season.

Matthias Opdenhövel returned as host. In August 2020, it was announced that Ruth Moschner and Rea Garvey would not be returning in the panelist for this season, but they will be returning in the fourth season, which will be air on 2021. On 15 September 2020, ProSieben announced that contestants from season one Bülent Ceylan and from season two Sonja Zietlow will be in the panel.

As in previous seasons, a spin-off show named The Masked Singer - red. Special was aired after each live episode, hosted by Viviane Geppert (episodes 1 and 3) and Annemarie Carpendale (episode 2, 4 and 6). On 16 November 2020, the episode wasn't played, because the live episode was played Monday. In the Final Carpendale hosted also, the red. - The Masked Singer Countdown, which aired for 15 Minutes before the final.

Guest panelists
Also this season, various guest panelists appeared as the third judge in the judging panel for one episode. These guest panelists included:

Contestants

Episodes

Week 1 (20 October)

Week 2 (27 October)

Week 3 (3 November)

Week 4 (10 November)

Week 5 (16 November) – Semi-final

Week 6 (24 November) – Final

 Group number: "One Night Only" by Jennifer Hudson

Round One

Round Two

Round Three

Reception

Ratings

References

External links
 

2020 German television seasons
The Masked Singer (German TV series)